Pakmahar is a village in Jhalakati District in the Barisal Division of southwestern Bangladesh.

See also
 List of villages in Bangladesh

References

Villages in Jhalokati District
Populated places in Jhalokati District
Villages in Barisal Division